Robert Wilton (born 22 February 1973) is a British writer and diplomat. As a diplomat he has worked in the Balkans, including as an advisor to the prime minister of Kosovo and as a Deputy Ambassador for the Organization for Security and Co-operation in Europe. As a writer he is known for his Comptrollerate-General series of historical novels, for the first of which he was awarded the Historical Writers' Association Crown.

Personal life and career
Robert Wilton grew up in the south-east of England. He attended Whitgift School, in Croydon, and read History at Christ Church, Oxford. In 1995 he joined the UK Ministry of Defence, where he held a variety of posts including as a Private Secretary to three Secretaries of State (the Labour politicians Des Browne, John Hutton and Bob Ainsworth). His Civil Service career also included stints in the Cabinet Office and Foreign & Commonwealth Office.

In 2006, the new Prime Minister of Kosovo, Agim Çeku, asked the British Government for help in developing and running his office. Because of his Whitehall experience and knowledge of the Balkans, Wilton was sent. He advised Çeku on international relations, communications and administration, accompanying the Prime Minister as his assistant in the 2007 Troika talks with Serbia. Wilton also worked for a short while under Prime Minister Hashim Thaçi. He was in Kosovo for the country's independence in February 2008. In 2010 he returned to Kosovo as Head of Policy and Political Affairs in the International Civilian Office, monitoring and advising the Kosovo Government. In 2013 he was appointed Deputy Ambassador of the Organization for Security and Co-operation in Europe (OSCE)'s Presence in Albania.

Since 1992 he has lived with the travel writer and educator Elizabeth Gowing. In 2009, together with a Kosovar friend, they founded The Ideas Partnership, a charity that supports the education and integration of children from marginalised and minority communities, as well as working to protect cultural heritage and the environment.

Works

The Comptrollerate-General novels
In the introduction to The Emperor's Gold, Wilton describes how – following a trail that started with a reference in a book to the occupant of his office a century earlier – he found in the Ministry of Defence archives the records of a department or organisation called the Comptrollerate-General for Scrutiny and Survey. Not widely known or well studied, the Comptrollerate-General is said to have existed for several centuries (sometimes with different forms or names) within the British Government's security and intelligence framework. In the Comptrollerate-General novels, Wilton prints documents from the archive to add background to what he calls 'fictionalisations' of key episodes in British history: taking the narrative from recognised history and the archive’s revelations, and embellishing it with conjectured characterisations and scenes.

In 2012 Wilton was awarded the Historical Writers' Association/Goldsboro Books Crown for best debut historical novel for The Emperor's Gold.

The 2013 Traitor's Field covers the years 1648–51, at the end of the British Civil Wars – broadly the events from the battle of Preston to the battle of Worcester and the escape of Charles II.

To mark the centenary of the assassination of the Archduke Franz Ferdinand, The Spider of Sarajevo was launched in the city on 28 June 2014. The novel presents the events of the weeks leading up to the assassination in the summer of 1914: the activities of four Comptrollerate-General agents travelling through Europe are used to explore the political and espionage context of the time, and the novel also shows the confusion within the evolving structures of British Intelligence.

The 2017 Treason's Spring, set in the French Revolution, is a prequel to The Emperor's Gold/ Treason's Tide. Set in the autumn of 1792, in the increasingly feverish atmosphere following the imprisonment of Louis XVI and the Battle of Valmy. It draws on two historical mysteries, the theft of the French Crown Jewels from the Garde-Meuble and the discovery of a cache of controversial royal correspondence in the Armoire de fer. The novel illuminates the roles of  Danton and the young Joseph Fouché.

The Gentleman Adventurer
In 2019 Wilton published the first of a new series of historical novels, again purporting to be based on found documents, in this case the memoir of a dissolute baronet in the period before World War I. A first-person narrative lighter in tone than his other novels, Death and the Dreadnought presents an espionage adventure around the construction of HMS Thunderer (1911) and the development of a new naval Fire-control system.

Non-fiction
Wilton writes frequently on the history and culture of south-eastern Europe, including the role of the international community and the concept of international intervention. A recurring theme is the outsiders' failure adequately to understand the local culture and society where they are operating, and the failure to learn the lessons of previous interventions. He also translates Albanian poetry into English, and has published and performed his translations.

References

1973 births
Living people
21st-century British novelists
Alumni of Christ Church, Oxford
British diplomats
English historical novelists
English spy fiction writers
English thriller writers
Writers of historical fiction set in the early modern period
Writers of historical fiction set in the modern age